The black-fronted dotterel (Elseyornis melanops) is a small plover wader in the Charadriidae family.

Description 
This shorebird is easily recognizable with its distinct black face mask, forehead and v-shaped band across the chest. Dorsally it is a mottled brown colour with the wings and crown of the head the same colour. This colouration is particularly useful for camouflage against aerial predators. 
Orbital eye rings and the first section of the bill are red, with the latter being black at the tip. The legs are pale orange. Unlike many other wading birds, black-fronted dotterels retain the same plumage all year round. 
As an adult, this small bird weighs between 26-39g with a wingspan of 105-119mm and a bill length of 14-17mm. 

Juveniles of this species are duller in colour with a greyish beak and lacking the black breast band and forehead.

Distribution and Habitat 

The black-fronted dotterel is widespread throughout Australia including in Tasmania and self-introduced in New Zealand where it is now also common. 

It inhabits the edges of freshwater sources including wetlands, lakes, swamps, dams and billabongs, and in shallow, temporary claypan pools. Occasionally, it can also be found occupying saline mudflats and estuaries. It will avoid water more than a few mm deep and heavy vegetation. 

Black-fronted dotterels are typically sedentary, with a single bird, a pair, or a family group occupying a stretch of habitat on a more or less permanent basis. However, some individuals appear to travel considerable distances, and flocks will sometimes congregate in food-rich areas.

Diet 
Their diet consists of crustaceans, insects and seeds. 
They forage in a series of short running motions, holding the body horizontal, stopping to peck from time to time with a rapid bobbing motion.

Breeding  

The black-fronted dotterel breeds between August and February, although is known to breed anytime conditions are right e.g. after suitable rains in Northern Australia. 
During courtship, both species will call and participate in aerial displays. 

Incubation of the 2-3 eggs is shared between males and females. When one parent is not incubating, they still rest and feed close to the nest. 
The nest is a small depression that can consist of twigs, shells and pebbles. The eggs are a greyish-yellow colour with brown and lavender markings. 
During incubation, if the eggs get too hot the adults will stand over the eggs to shade them from the harsh sun or wet the feathers on their stomach to wet and cool the eggs. The egg gestation period is 4–5 weeks. Twenty-four hours after they hatch the chicks leave the nest to hide in less exposed areas, while at the same time both parents look after them.

Both parents will call loudly and feign injury to lure predators away from the nest.

Gallery

References

External links 

black-fronted dotterel
Birds of Australia
black-fronted dotterel
Articles containing video clips
black-fronted dotterel